The 13th Cortes Generales was a meeting of the Cortes Generales, the national legislature of Spain, with the membership determined primarily by the results of the general election held on 28 April 2019. The cortes met for the first time on 21 May 2019 and was dissolved prematurely on 24 September 2019.

Election
The 13th Spanish general election under the 1978 Constitution was held on 28 April 2019. It saw the Spanish Socialist Workers' Party (PSOE) become the largest party in the Senate, the upper house of the Cortes Generales, for the first time since 1993, as well as the largest party in the Congress of Deputies, the lower house of the Cortes Generales, for the first time since 2008, but falling short of a majority.

History
The new Senate met for the first time on 21 May 2019 and elected Manuel Cruz (PSOE) as President of the Senate of Spain.

The new Congress of Deputies also met for the first time on 21 May 2019 and after two rounds of voting Meritxell Batet (PSOE) was elected as President of the Congress of Deputies with the support of the Unidos Podemos-En Comú Podem (UP-ECP) and various nationalist and regionalist parties.

In July 2019 caretaker Prime Minister Pedro Sánchez (POSE) failed to secure the necessary votes in congress to form a government after the failure of coalition talks with UP–ECP. Sánchez announced on 17 September 2019 that an election would be held on 10 November 2019, the fourth in as many years. The 13th Cortes Generales was formally dissolved on 24 September 2019.

Members

Senate

Congress of Deputies

References

2019 establishments in Spain
2019 disestablishments in Spain
Cortes Generales